Grover Washington Jr. (December 12, 1943 – December 17, 1999) was an American jazz-funk and soul-jazz saxophonist and Grammy Award Winner. Along with Wes Montgomery and George Benson, he is considered by many to be one of the founders of the smooth jazz genre.
He wrote some of his material and later became an arranger and producer.

Throughout the 1970s and 1980s, Washington made some of the genre's most memorable hits, including "Mister Magic", "Reed Seed", "Black Frost", "Winelight", "Inner City Blues", "Let it Flow (For 'Dr. J')" and "The Best is Yet to Come".  In addition, he performed very frequently with other artists, including Bill Withers on "Just the Two of Us", Patti LaBelle on "The Best Is Yet to Come" and Phyllis Hyman on "A Sacred Kind of Love". He is also remembered for his take on the Dave Brubeck classic "Take Five", and for his 1996 version of "Soulful Strut".

Early life
Washington was born in Buffalo, New York, United States, on December 12, 1943. His mother was a church chorister, and his father was a collector of old jazz gramophone records and a saxophonist as well, so music was everywhere in the home. He grew up listening to the great jazzmen and big band leaders like Benny Goodman, Fletcher Henderson, and others like them. At the age of 8, Grover Sr. gave Jr. a saxophone. He practiced and would sneak into clubs to see famous Buffalo blues musicians. His younger brother, drummer Daryl Washington, would follow in his footsteps, he also had another younger brother named Michael Washington, who was an accomplished Gospel Music organist who mastered the Hammond B3 organ. He was part of a vocal ensemble, The Teen Kings, which included Lonnie Smith.

Career

Early career
Washington left Buffalo and played with a Midwest group called the Four Clefs and then the Mark III Trio from Mansfield, Ohio. Shortly thereafter, he was drafted into the U.S. Army, where he met drummer Billy Cobham. A music mainstay in New York City, Cobham introduced Washington to many New York musicians. After leaving the Army, Washington freelanced his talents around New York City, eventually landing in Philadelphia in 1967. In 1970 and 1971, he appeared on Leon Spencer's first two albums on Prestige Records, together with Idris Muhammad and Melvin Sparks.

Washington's big break came when alto sax man Hank Crawford was unable to make a recording date with Creed Taylor's Kudu Records, and Washington took his place, even though he was a backup. This led to his first solo album, Inner City Blues. He was talented and displayed heart and soul with soprano, alto, tenor, and baritone saxophones. Refreshing for his time, he made headway into the jazz mainstream.

Rise to fame
While his first three albums established him as a force in jazz and soul music, it was his fourth album in 1974, Mister Magic, that proved a major commercial success. The album climbed to number 1 on Billboard's R&B album chart and number 10 on Billboard's Top 40 album chart. The title track reached No. 16 on the R&B singles chart (#54, pop). All these albums included guitarist Eric Gale as a near-permanent member in Washington's arsenal. His follow-up on Kudu in 1975, Feels So Good also made No. 1 on Billboard's R&B album chart and No. 10 on the pop album chart. Both albums were major parts of the jazz-funk movement of the mid-1970s.

A string of acclaimed records brought Washington through the 1970s, culminating in the signature piece for everything he would do from then on. Winelight (1980) was the album that defined everything Washington was then about, having signed for Elektra Records, part of the major Warner Music group. The album was smooth, fused with R&B and easy listening feel. Washington's love of basketball, especially the Philadelphia 76ers, led him to dedicate the second track, "Let It Flow", to Julius Erving (Dr. J). The highlight of the album was his collaboration with soul artist Bill Withers, "Just the Two of Us", a hit on radio during the spring and summer of 1981, peaking at No. 2 on the Billboard Hot 100. The album went platinum in 1981, and also won Grammy Awards in 1982 for Best R&B Song ("Just The Two of Us"), and Best Jazz Fusion Performance ("Winelight"). "Winelight" was also nominated for Record of the Year and Song of the Year.

In the post-Winelight era, Washington is credited for giving rise to a new batch of talent that would make its mark in the late 1980s and early 1990s. He is known for bringing Kenny G to the forefront, as well as artists such as Walter Beasley, Steve Cole, Pamela Williams, Najee, Boney James and George Howard. His song "Mister Magic" is noted as being influential on go-go music starting in the mid-1970s.

Equipment

(Although he was later photographed with Keilwerth SX90 and SX90R black nickel plated soprano, alto, and tenor saxophones on album covers, he rarely played them live or in the studio.)

Death
On December 17, 1999, five days after his 56th birthday, Washington collapsed while waiting in the green room after performing four songs for The Saturday Early Show, at CBS Studios in New York City. He was taken to St. Luke's-Roosevelt Hospital, where he was pronounced dead at about 7:30 pm. His doctors determined that he had suffered a massive heart attack. He is interred at West Laurel Hill Cemetery in Bala Cynwyd, Pennsylvania.

Tributes
A large mural of Washington, part of the Philadelphia Mural Arts Program, is just south of the intersection of Broad and Diamond streets. A Philadelphia middle school in the Olney section of the city is named after Washington. Grover Washington Jr. Middle School caters to fifth- to eighth-grade students interested in the creative and performing arts.

There is a mural dedicated to Grover Washington, Jr. in Buffalo, where he grew up and attended school.

Discography

As leader

As sideman 

With Eddie Henderson
 Inspiration (Milestone, 1995) – rec. 1994
 Tribute to Lee Morgan (NYC Music, 1995)

With Boogaloo Joe Jones
 No Way! (Prestige, 1971) – rec. 1970
 What It Is (Prestige, 1971)

With Johnny "Hammond" Smith
 What's Going On (Prestige, 1971)
 Breakout (Kudu, 1971)
 Wild Horses Rock Steady (Kudu, 1972) – rec. 1971

With Leon Spencer
 Sneak Preview! (Prestige, 1971) – rec. 1970
 Louisiana Slim (Prestige, 1971)

With others
 Kathleen Battle, So Many Stars (Sony, 1995)
 Kenny Burrell, Togethering (Blue Note, 1985) – recorded in 1984
 Hank Crawford, Help Me Make it Through the Night (Kudu, 1972)
 Charles Earland, Living Black! (Prestige, 1971) – live recorded in 1970
 Dexter Gordon, American Classic (Elektra Musician, 1982)
 Urbie Green, Señor Blues (CTI, 1977)
 Masaru Imada, Blue Marine (Trio, 1982)
 The Mark III Trio, Let's Ska at the Ski Lodge (Downhill, 1964)
 Idris Muhammad, Power of Soul (Kudu, 1974)
 Gerry Mulligan, Dragonfly (Telarc Jazz, 1995)
 Don Sebesky, Giant Box (CTI, 1973)
 Lonnie Smith, Mama Wailer (Kudu, 1971)
 Melvin Sparks, Spark Plug (Prestige, 1971)
 Mal Waldron, My Dear Family (Evidence, 1993)
 Randy Weston, Blue Moses (CTI, 1972)
 Bill Withers, Just the Two of Us (Columbia, 1981)

Singles

References

External links
 Grover Washington Jr. at Legacy Recordings 
 Grover Washington TV Interview from C Music TV
 Jazz Conversations with Eric Jackson: Grover Washington Jr. from WGBH Radio Boston

1943 births
1999 deaths
African-American jazz composers
African-American jazz musicians
African-American woodwind musicians
American jazz soprano saxophonists
American jazz alto saxophonists
American jazz tenor saxophonists
American male saxophonists
Soul-jazz saxophonists
Musicians from Buffalo, New York
Smooth jazz saxophonists
Grammy Award winners
Musicians from Philadelphia
Motown artists
Columbia Records artists
Elektra Records artists
Burials at West Laurel Hill Cemetery
20th-century jazz composers
20th-century American saxophonists
20th-century American composers
Jazz musicians from New York (state)
Jazz musicians from Pennsylvania
American male jazz composers
American jazz composers
20th-century American male musicians
The Blackout All-Stars members
CTI Records artists
20th-century African-American musicians